Contraband was a short-lived supergroup/side project that included members of several famous rock bands from the 1980s, such as Shark Island, McAuley Schenker Group, Ratt, L.A. Guns, and Vixen.

Contraband came to be after a Vixen and Ratt unplugged session on MTV.

The band released only one self-titled album in 1991 which received lukewarm reviews. The album was a commercial failure and the band disbanded shortly after, while touring with Ratt. The song "Loud Guitars, Fast Cars & Wild, Wild Livin'" was included in the movie If Looks Could Kill soundtrack. In the US, the album charted at number 187. Their cover version of "All the Way from Memphis" appeared on the UK  record chart in July 1991. "Loud Guitars, Fast Cars & Wild, Wild Livin'" was later covered as "Loud Guitars, Fast Cars & Wild, Wild Women" by Blue Tears later in the early 1990s and released for the 2005 album Dancin' On the Back Streets.

Band members
 Richard Black (Shark Island) – vocals
 Michael Schenker (McAuley Schenker Group) – guitars, backing vocals
 Tracii Guns (L.A. Guns) – guitars, backing vocals
 Share Pedersen (Vixen) – bass guitar, backing vocals
 Bobby Blotzer (Ratt) – drums, backing vocals

Contraband (1991)

Track listing

Credits
Spencer Sercombe – guitars, backing vocals, musical director
Steffan Presley – keyboards
Kevin Beamish – backing vocals, producer, engineer, mixing
Randy Nicklaus – producer, mixing
Joe Barresi – engineer
Steve Hall – mastering

See also
List of glam metal bands and artists

References

1991 debut albums
Glam metal musical groups from California
Hard rock musical groups from California
Heavy metal musical groups from California
Heavy metal supergroups
Impact Records albums
Musical groups established in 1990
Musical groups from Los Angeles
Albums recorded at Sound City Studios